Hilldale Park was a ballpark in Darby, Pennsylvania at the northeast corner of Chester and Cedar Avenues. It was the home field of the Hilldale Club professional baseball team which played in the Negro leagues between 1910 and 1932. The ballpark opened in 1914. It had a well-manicured field with a large tree in center-field, whose branches overlooked the field and were considered in play.

Hilldale's average attendance at Hilldale Park was 1,844 per-game in 1926 and 1,371 in 1929.

The ballpark site now contains retail stores and parking lots.

Contemporary Honors and Celebrations

Historical Marker
On October 14, 2006, over 500 individuals gathered for the dedication of a Pennsylvania Historical marker at the former site of the ballpark. The ceremony was attended by Philadelphia Phillies hitting coach Milt Thompson, former Phillies player Garry Maddox, and Gene Dias, Phillies director of community relations,. Also attending were the four living members of the Negro league Philadelphia Stars, Bill Cash, Mahlon Duckett, Stanley Glenn, and Harold Gould, and Ray Mackey, great grandnephew of former Hilldale and Stars player Biz Mackey. Area businessman John Bossong led the effort for the historical marker.

The marker is titled, "The Hilldale Athletic Club (The Darby Daisies)" and the text reads,

This baseball team, whose home was here at Hilldale Park, won the Eastern Colored League championship three times and the 1925 Negro League World Series. Darby fielded Negro League teams from 1910 to 1932. Notable players included baseball hall of fame members Pop Lloyd, Judy Johnson, Martin Dihigo, Joe Williams, Oscar Charleston, Ben Taylor, Biz Mackey, and Louis Santop. Owner Ed Bolden helped form the Eastern Colored League.

See also
 Hilldale Club

References

External links
Project Ballpark: Hilldale Park
NLBM Discussion about Hilldale Park

Defunct sports venues in Philadelphia
Defunct baseball venues in the United States
Demolished buildings and structures in Pennsylvania
Negro league baseball venues
Demolished sports venues in Pennsylvania
Baseball venues in Pennsylvania
1914 establishments in Pennsylvania
Sports venues completed in 1914